Chithralaya also spelt Chitralaya, is an Indian film production company founded in the early 1960s. It produced films in Tamil and Hindi, most of them directed by C. V. Sridhar. The company was founded by Sridhar, screenwriter Chitralaya Gopu, cinematographer A. Vincent and still photographer Tiruchi Arunachalam.

History 
After making films for Venus Studios, in the early 1960s Sridhar founded Chithralaya to make the kind of films he wanted. The company's logo featured a boatman and a woman travelling on a boat with the tagline, "Kadal Alayil Engal Siriya Thoni, Kalai Ulagil Engal Pudhiya Baani". When discussing with his associates what should be the company's first film, Sridhar devised the story of Nenjil Or Aalayam but later decided the company's first film should not be a tragedy and devised the lighter Thennilavu. Thennilavu was a success at the box office, running in theatres for over 100 days. After the success of Thennilavu, Sridhar made Nenjil Or Aalayam, set completely in a hospital and became the first Tamil film to be shot entirely in single set. It also became a box-office success.

Chithralaya later produced Kadhalikka Neramillai, the first Tamil film in Eastmancolor with a contemporary setting. Though the film initially found no takers, forcing Chithralaya to distribute the film themselves, it became a major success. Gopu, one of the founders of the company, left after receiving more directorial offers. Sridhar's relative C. V. Rajendran was an assistant director in Chithralaya before making his directorial debut with Anubavam Pudhumai by a different studio. Thriveni was the only Malayalam film produced by Chithralaya. Uttharavindri Ulle Vaa, unlike Chithralaya's previous ventures, was only produced by Sridhar, and directed by debutant N. S. Chakravarthi. A magazine named after and run by Chithralaya was also founded. Many of Chithralaya's film posters were designed by Eswara Rao, among the most prolific poster designers in India.

Filmography

References

External links 
Chithralaya at IMDb
Chithralaya at Bollywood Hungama

Film production companies based in Chennai
Film production companies of India